The Research Science Institute (RSI) is an international summer research program for high school students. RSI is sponsored by the Center for Excellence in Education (CEE) and hosted by MIT in Cambridge, Massachusetts. RSI brings together the top STEM talent from around the world for the opportunity to conduct original scientific research, cost-free, for six weeks during the summer, before their final year of high school.

History
The Research Science Institute was founded in 1984 by Admiral H.G. Rickover and Joann P. DiGennaro. It was originally called the "Rickover Science Institute" until the 1986 session, when it was renamed to its current name. The original name is also the source of the nickname of RSI attendees, "Rickoids".

Program 
RSI is run by CEE president Joann P. DiGennaro and Executive Vice President Maite P. Ballestero. 100 students from several countries (generally, two-thirds of the students are from the United States and one-third from other countries) are selected to participate in the six-week summer program.  More than 1,700 applications are received each year, making RSI one of the most selective summer programs in the United States.

The first week of RSI is composed of tutorials and seminars on contemporary research of interest by esteemed Professors from top universities, many of whom are alumni. The next four weeks are centered on individual research projects through mentors in the Boston area, the majority being at labs at MIT, Harvard and other local universities. The last week is devoted to paper and presentation writing, following by the RSI Final Symposium, and encore presentations, which features the top 10 presentations decided by academic staff at RSI. After that, the top 5 presentations are determined by a panel of industry leaders in research and STEM.

The RSI Distinguished Lecture Series, which continues throughout the program, brings distinguished professors, scientists, and industry leaders in STEM, including a number of Nobel laureates, many of whom are RSI alumni, to speak to RSI students in evening lecture-style format. In recent years, the RSI Distinguished Lecture Series has included Nobel Prize-winning physicist Wolfgang Ketterle, Nobel Prize-winning chemist Dudley Herschbach, Nobel Prize-winning geneticist Phillip Sharp, evolutionary biologist Pardis Sabeti, mathematician and chess master Noam Elkies, Akamai Technologies co-founder and CEO Tom Leighton, and mathematician Michael Sipser.  RSI's staff is generally composed primarily, if not entirely, of alumni, with recent Rickoids (RSI alumni, from the Institute's original name) filling in as counselors and TAs and older alumni taking administrative, lecturing, or tutoring positions.

Location
Though it has convened at various locations (including two years, 1990 and 2004, when the program was held concurrently on both coasts of the US, - at UC San Diego and The George Washington University in 1989-1991, and Caltech and MIT in 2004), the Institute is most often associated with MIT, where it has been held every summer since 1992, for various reasons including availability of local mentorships (with Massachusetts General Hospital, MIT, and Harvard Medical School all within a few minutes of central campus) and convenience of facilities. The program participants were housed in East Campus through 2003, Simmons Hall from 2004-2013, Fariborz Maseeh Hall from 2014-2017, MacGregor House in 2018, and Baker House in 2019. In 2020 and 2021, however, RSI went fully virtual due to the COVID-19 pandemic. RSI returned to in-person in 2022, and participants were housed in Next House.

Similar programs in other countries
In 2006, a new program, RSI-Fudan, (Chinese name: 未来科学家夏令营) was held at Fudan University in Shanghai, China for Chinese students. Thirty-five local students were selected from key high schools to participate in the program and the staff was composed with previous Rickoids and CEE/Fudan affiliates from both the U.S. and China.  Five years later, in 2011, another new program, the Saudi Research Science Institute, or SRSI, was founded, and held at King Abdullah University of Science and Technology in Thuwal, Saudi Arabia.  In the first year of SRSI (2011), twenty-five scientifically talented students were selected and attended a six-week session modeled on RSI. The number of students was increased to forty in 2012 and 2013 and to forty-five in 2014. In the summer of 2015, the inaugural RSI Tsinghua was held in Beijing for the very first time. As an official cooperation between the CEE and Tsinghua University, this program held research experiences for 34 outstanding high school students in China. In Sweden, Research Academy for Young Scientists (RAYS) takes place annually for 21 incoming high school seniors who are most qualified in STEM.

In 2009, Center for Excellence in Education started the first chapter in India in the city of Chennai, It was called Research Science Initiative-Chennai. It is an intensive four-week program held at the Indian Institute of Technology Madras. This was in collaboration with the PSBB Group of Schools, IIT Madras, Chennai Mathematical Institute, SASTRA University and other leading institutions in the fields of science and technology. This was with the support of all secondary schools in Chennai from where the students were selected. After a pilot program in 2009, it was expanded the following year with Ms. Joann P. DiGennaro presiding over the valediction.

A similar program, Summer Research School in mathematics and informatics, has been running in Bulgaria since 2001. It is intended for high school students with profound interests in mathematics, informatics (computer science) and IT. At first, the program was attended each year by 40 Bulgarian students but now in accepts international students. In 2016 the Summer Research School was attended by 50 students, of whom 9 were international. The program is organized by the High School Student Institute of Mathematics and Informatics.

The Science Research Programme in Singapore was modeled after RSI.

Alumni
Fields Medalist Terence Tao attended RSI in 1989. ActBlue was founded by two 1994 RSI participants, Benjamin Rahn and Matt DeBergalis. Pinterest co-founder Ben Silbermann and American physicist Jeremy England attended RSI in 1998.  Broad Institute and MIT neurobiologist, optogenetics pioneer, developer of the CRISPR/Cas9 gene editing method, and "35 Innovators Under 35" laureate Feng Zhang attended RSI in 1999. Two of the four members of musical quartet The Gregory Brothers, Andrew Gregory and Michael Gregory, were 2008 RSI participants. A full list of Rickoid of the Year winners is published on the Center for Excellence in Education's website, which includes Mayor of Evanston Daniel Biss, physicist Jeremy England, UMass Med School professor Oliver Rando, American biophysicist Jed Macosko, and Genius Junior participant Apoorva Panidapu.

As of 2022, 191 finalists, 697 semifinalists, and 12 1st-place winners in the Regeneron Science Talent Search have been RSI alumni. In the Siemens Competition, 243 finalists and semifinalists, and three 1st-place winners have been RSI alumni. As of 2022, 13 Rhodes Scholars and 15 Marshall Scholars have been RSI alumni.

References

External links
 Research Science Institute
 High School Student Institute of Mathematics and Informatics
 Summer Research School

High school research programs